Moriches may refer to:

Moriches, New York
Moriches Bay, Long Island, New York
Moriches Inlet, Long Island, New York
Moriches (LIRR Sag Harbor station), the original name of the Eastport station on the Long Island Rail Road, New York
Moriches (Brooklyn and Montauk Railroad station), the original name of the Center Moriches station on the Long Island Rail Road, New York

See also
Center Moriches, New York
East Moriches, New York
Moriche (Mauritia flexuosa), a palm tree
Moraches, Nièvre, France